Dr. Stone is a 2019 television anime series produced by TMS Entertainment based on the manga of the same name written by Riichiro Inagaki, illustrated by Boichi, and published in Shueisha's Weekly Shōnen Jump magazine. 3,700 years after a mysterious light turns every human on the planet into stone, genius boy Senku Ishigami emerges from his petrification into a "Stone World" and seeks to rebuild human civilization from the ground up. The series is directed by Shinya Iino, with Yuichiro Kido as scriptwriter, and Yuko Iwasa as character designer. Tatsuya Kato, Hiroaki Tsutsumi, and Yuki Kanesaka compose the series' music. The first season aired from July 5 to December 13, 2019 on Tokyo MX and other channels. The first season ran for 24 episodes. The season is streamed by Crunchyroll worldwide outside of Asia, and Funimation produced a simuldub. The English dub of the anime began airing on Adult Swim's Toonami programming block on August 25, 2019.

The opening theme is "Good Morning World!" by Burnout Syndromes, while the series' ending theme is "Life"  by Rude-α. The second opening theme is "Sangenshoku" by Pelican Fanclub, while the series' second ending theme is "Yume No Youna" by Saeki YouthK.



Episode list

Notes

References

External links
 

2019 Japanese television seasons
Dr. Stone episode lists